"Everything's Gonna Be Alright" is the second single released in November 1991 from American hip hop group Naughty by Nature's self-titled second album (1991). The song is titled "Ghetto Bastard" on uncensored versions of the eponymous album. While not as successful as their previous single, "O.P.P.", "Everything's Gonna Be Alright" managed to make it to 53 on the Billboard Hot 100 and 9 on the Hot Rap Singles. The song would later appear on both of the group's compilation albums, 1999's Nature's Finest: Naughty by Nature's Greatest Hits and 2003's Greatest Hits: Naughty's Nicest. It was rerecorded for the 2011 release, Anthem Inc.

The song's chorus is derived from Bob Marley's "No Woman, No Cry". The bass line in the song "Holy" by  Justin Bieber is almost identical to the one in this song.

Critical reception
Larry Flick from Billboard wrote, "Follow-up to platinum single "O.P.P." is not as light and fluffy, though it will establish rap act as lyricists to be reckoned with. Story lines about surviving fatherless homes seem to be all the rage at the moment. Here, topic is handled with an intelligent and optimistic hand." New Musical Express said, "Here they hook up to the jamdown sound of Bob Marley and the Wailers' classic of yore and impregnate it with their own special blend of ghetto wisdom. A subtle and welcome switch from the usual Uzi-toting brag that many rappers prefer to spout and a clear indication that rap has still got a lot to say." A reviewer from Music & Media noted that here, the "talented rap crew" had replaced the reggae beat of the Marley song with a modern dance groove, complimenting it as "easy programmable."

Retrospective response
Jesse Ducker from Albumism said in his 2021 retrospective review of the Naughty by Nature album, that "Everything's Gonna Be Alright" is "the stronger and more incisive recording [than its predecessor]." He described it as "unremittingly bleak", adding, "I can think of few songs that are better at presenting a first-person account of despair and poverty." Jean Rosenbluth from Los Angeles Times wrote that in the "bittersweet" song, the group delivered "an astonishingly powerful song (melody and all)" that is second in life-in-the-ghetto resonance only to the Geto Boys' "Mind Playing Tricks on Me".

Music video
A music video was produced to promote the single, featuring the band rapping as they walk on sidewalks throughout the inner city. While hanging out they chase away a drug dealer and scare him with a machete. The video was later published on Tommy Boy Records' official YouTube channel in June 2018. It has amassed more than 2,8 million views as of October 2021.

Single track listing

A-Side
"Everything's Gonna Be Alright" (LP Version)- 4:51  
"Everything's Gonna Be Alright" (Radio Mix)- 4:14

B-Side
"O.P.P." (Live)- 6:15  
"Everything's Gonna Be Alright" (Everything's OK)- 4:50  
"Everything's Gonna Be Alright" (Everything's OK Instrumental)- 4:14

Charts

References

1991 singles
Naughty by Nature songs
1991 songs
Tommy Boy Records singles
Songs written by Treach
Songs written by KayGee
Songs written by Vin Rock
Song recordings produced by Naughty by Nature